The Rogers House is a historic home in Daytona Beach, Florida, United States. It is located at 436 North Beach Street. On September 11, 1986, it was added to the U.S. National Register of Historic Places.

References and external links
 Volusia County listings at National Register of Historic Places
 Florida's Office of Cultural and Historical Programs
 Volusia County listings
 Rogers House
 Great Floridians of Daytona Beach

Houses on the National Register of Historic Places in Volusia County, Florida
Buildings and structures in Daytona Beach, Florida
Houses completed in 1878
1878 establishments in Florida